Milica Jovanović (born August 14, 1989) is Montenegrin female basketball player, currently playing for Luleå Basket in Basketligan dam.

In the 2008-2009 season, she played for Buducnost Podgorica, which won the Montenegrin League Championship.

In the 2020-2021 season in Turkey, she played for Izmit Belediyespor, with 11.6 points including 45.7% 3-pointers, 4 rebounds and 1.3 assists for 10.1 rating in 28 minutes in 7 Euroleague games. In 2021, she signed with Nantes Rezé

References

External links
Profile at eurobasket.com

Living people
Sportspeople from Nikšić
Montenegrin women's basketball players
1989 births
Centers (basketball)
Olympiacos Women's Basketball players
Beşiktaş women's basketball players